Berwick Area Senior High School (also called Berwick Area High School, Berwick High School or BHS) is a small, rural, public high school  in Columbia County, in Northeastern Pennsylvania, United States. In Columbia County, the school serves children living in Briar Creek Township Briar Creek, Berwick and Foundryville. The school also serves children living in East Berwick, Nescopeck, Nescopeck Township, Hollenback Township and Salem Township in Luzerne County. The school is the only public high school in the Berwick Area School District.

Extracurriculars

Berwick Area School District offers a wide variety of clubs, activities and an extensive sports program. It is the only public school district in Columbia County that does not participate in the Pennsylvania Heartland Athletic Conference.

Sports
Noted for American football especially, the high school team has won the state championship six times. Also, the football team was ranked number 1 nationally by USA Today three times. Berwick won the 2008 PIAA AAA Baseball State Championship. The Bulldogs defeated Somerset 6 to 2 at Blair County Stadium and became the first baseball team in the Wyoming Valley Conference to win the state title. It is the school's first baseball state championship in its history. Also in 2008, the Berwick golf team was the District 2 and District 11 champions. The Berwick wrestling team won back to back District 2 championships in 2007 and 2008, as well as finishing in the top Eight PIAA AA Team Championships in 2008.

The school mascot is the Bulldog and the sports teams are called the Bulldogs, or just "Dawgs" for short. School colors and blue and white.

The District funds:

Boys
American football - AAA
Baseball - AAA
Basketball - AAA
Bowling - AAAA
Cross country -  AA
Golf - AAA
Rifle - AAAA
Soccer - AA
Swimming and diving - AA
Tennis - AA
Track and field - AAA
Volleyball -  AA
Wrestling - AAA

Girls
Basketball - AAA
Bowling - AAAA
Cross country - AA
Field hockey - AA
Golf - AAA
Rifle - AAAA
Soccer (fall) - AA
Softball - AAA
Tennis - AA
Track and field - AAA
Volleyball -  AA

Notable alumni 
 Zehnder Confair (1906-1982), Pennsylvania state senator
 Jimmy Spencer, retired NASCAR driver
 Ron Powlus, Notre Dame quarterback and NFL player 
 Day Turner, World War II Medal of Honor recipient
 Bo Orlando, NFL defensive back for the Houston Oilers, San Diego Chargers, Cincinnati Bengals and the Pittsburgh Steelers
 Matt Karchner, retired baseball player
 Mike Souchak, professional golfer
 Nick Adams, actor (The Rebel TV show)
 Joe Colone, NBA player for the New York Knicks
 Paul Stenn, NFL player for New York Giants, Washington Redskins, Pittsburgh Steelers and Chicago Bears

References

External links 
 Berwick football team website
 The Bleachers at Berwick Area High School

Public high schools in Pennsylvania
Schools in Columbia County, Pennsylvania